Anna University Chennai-Regional Campus, Coimbatore, [previously Anna University, Coimbatore and Anna University of Technology, Coimbatore], is a regional campus of Anna University. It offers full time UG and PG courses in university campus in Coimbatore along with more than 40 degree programmes through its Distance Education Arm Directorate of Online and Distance Education. It was established in 2007.

History
Anna University, Coimbatore was established on 1 February 2007 as a result of a decision to split Anna University into six universities, namely, Anna University, Chennai, Anna University of Technology, Chennai, Anna University of Technology, Tiruchirappalli, Anna University, Coimbatore, Anna University of Technology Tirunelveli and Anna University of Technology, Madurai. In 2010 it was renamed Anna University of Technology, Coimbatore.

In September 14, 2011 a bill was passed to merge back the universities and make it a regional campus of Anna University. The regional campus of was established during 2012.

Campus
The campus is located on 130.33 acres of land close to Bharathiar University. Initially the university operated from a temporary campus situated in the Jothi Mills compound, before shifting to the current location.

Affiliated colleges

Government colleges

 Government College of Engineering, Bargur
 Government College of Technology, Coimbatore
 Government College of Engineering, Salem

Government aided colleges

 Coimbatore Institute of Technology
 PSG College of Technology
 Institute of Road & Transport Technology

Self-financing colleges

 Adhiyamaan College of Engineering
 Adithya Institute of Technology
 Al-Ameen Engineering College
 Bannari Amman Institute of Technology
 CSI College of Engineering
 Chettinad College of Engineering and Technology
 Info Institute of Engineering
 JCT College of Engineering and Technology
 K. S. Rangasamy College of Technology, Thiruchengode
 Kalaivani College of Technology, 
 Kalaignar Karunanidhi Institute of Technology
 King College of Technology
 Kongu Engineering College
 KTVR Knowledge Park for Engineering and Technology
 KV Institute of Management and Information Studies
 Paavai College of Engineering
 Paavai Engineering College
 Pavai College of Technology
 PPG Institute of Technology
 Shree Venkateshwara Hi-Tech Engineering College
 SNS College of Engineering
 SNS College of Technology
 Sona College of Technology
 Sri Krishna College of Engineering & Technology
 Sri Ramakrishna Engineering College
 Sri Ramakrishna Institute of Technology
 Tamil Nadu College of Engineering, Karumathampatti

References

External links
 

Memorials to C. N. Annadurai
Engineering colleges in Coimbatore